Garmab (also Romanized as Garmāb) is a village in Faruj Rural District, in the Central District of Faruj County, North Khorasan Province, Iran. At the 2006 census, its population was 43, in 17 families.

References 

Populated places in Faruj County